James Mitchell Ashley (November 14, 1824September 16, 1896) was an American politician and abolitionist. A member of the Republican Party, Ashley served as a member of the United States House of Representatives from Ohio during the American Civil War, where he became a leader of the Radical Republicans and pushed for passage of the Thirteenth Amendment, ending slavery in the United States. He also authored the resolution which started the first impeachment inquiry against Andrew Johnson. After the war, he served as Governor of the Montana Territory and president of the Ann Arbor Railroad.

Early and family life
Ashley was born in Allegheny County, Pennsylvania, to John Ashley, a bookbinder and Campbellite preacher who evangelized in Kentucky and West Virginia, and his wife Mary A. (Kilpatrick) Ashley of Kentucky. As a boy in the Ohio River valley, Ashley saw coffles of chained slaves being walked to the Deep South, boys his own age being sold, and even white men who refused to let their cattle drink from a stream in which his father had baptized slaves. He grew to hate the "peculiar institution" (which he considered a violation of Christian principles) and the oligarchy that supported it.

Ashley was mostly self-taught in elementary subjects, although his father wanted him to follow family tradition and become a Baptist minister. Rather than attend a seminary, the 14 year old ran away to become a cabin boy on Ohio and Mississippi River boats, and later worked as a clerk on those boats. He had begun helping slaves to escape as early as 1839, and late in his life Ashley relished telling stories of the families he had saved as a 17 year old. He told the story later in life, which came down through the family that, when he left the home at 14, the last words his father said to him as he went off was: "You're on the straight road to Hell, boy!" Twenty years later, when he was elected to the U.S. House of Representatives, his first act, when he sat down in his office in Washington, D.C., was to pen his father, to whom he had not spoken in twenty years, a letter on the Congressional stationary: "Dear Father, I have just arrived!"

He married Emma Jane Smith in 1851 and together they had four children. He is the great-grandfather of U.S. Representative Thomas W. L. Ashley and a number of other descendants, including James Ashley IV, a portraitist living in Chicago.

Ashley was a Freemason, belonging to the Toledo Lodge No. 144 in Toledo, Ohio.

Early political activism
In 1848, the burly six-foot tall youth settled in Portsmouth, Ohio, where he became a journalist—first at the Portsmouth Dispatch and later editor of the Portsmouth Democrat. The following year, 1849, he was admitted to the Ohio Bar but did not practice. Instead, by 1851, abolitionist activities caused Ashley and his wife to flee north to Toledo, Ohio to avoid prosecution under the Fugitive Slave Act of 1850. There, Ashley opened a drug store (which was soon burned down) and also became involved in the new Republican Party, campaigning for its presidential candidate John C. Fremont and congressman Richard Mott.

James Ashley was an active abolitionist who traveled with John Brown's wife to Brown's execution in December, 1859, and reported the event in the still-extant local newspaper, the Toledo Blade. In 1858, he led the Ohio Republican Party. As the year ended, Ashley was elected to U.S. House of Representatives of the 36th United States Congress, and took office the following year.

Congressional career

Ashley served in the United States House of Representatives from 1859 through 1869, representing Ohio's 5th congressional district for two terms (1859–63) and Ohio's 10th congressional district for three terms (1863–69).

While in Congress (the 37th through 40th sessions), Ashley served as the Chairman of the Committee on Territories, and was instrumental to the creation (naming and borders) of the territories of Montana, Idaho, Wyoming, and Washington. He also authored the Arizona Organic Act. However, he opposed the Church of Jesus Christ of Latter-day Saints and especially polygamy, and limited Utah's boundaries to reduce Mormon influence.

During the American Civil War, Ashley took an active role in supporting the recruitment of troops for the Union Army. He also became a leader among the Radical Republicans, writing a bill to abolish slavery in the District of Columbia in 1862. In 1863 he introduced a bill to create a constitutional amendment to end slavery which ultimately (with Ashley as House Majority floor manager) passed in the House, exceeding the needed a 2/3 margin by merely 2 votes on January 31, 1865. This was ultimately ratified as the Thirteenth Amendment to the United States Constitution, formally abolishing slavery in the United States.

Ashley suspected President Andrew Johnson, who succeeded Lincoln as president after Lincoln's death, of complicity in President Lincoln's assassination. Ashley also attempted to persuade the House Committee on the Judiciary of this. He described Johnson as being a," loathing incubus which has blotted our country's history." He also criticized Johnson for attempting to veto extensions of the Freedmen's Bureau, the Civil Rights Bill and the Reconstruction Acts. He suspected Johnson's ties with southern oligarchs. Ashley was among the first to explore impeaching Johnson as president, beginning to desire Johnson's impeachment in late 1866. His exploration led to his authoring of a January 7, 1867 resolution which launched the first impeachment inquiry against Andrew Johnson, thus the Ashley iniated the first official impeachment proceedings against Johnson. This inquiry led to a defeated resolution to impeach Johnson which the House voted against on December 7, 1867. However, the following February, the House voted to impeach Johnson. Johnson was ultimately acquitted in his impeachment trial.

Territorial Governor of Montana
Ashley's radical views, particularly on race, as well as his support for educational qualifications, did not endear him to voters. Democrat Truman Hoag defeated him by less than 1,000 votes in the 1868 election, which nearly bankrupted Ashley. However, President Grant appointed Ashley territorial governor of Democratic-leaning Montana Territory, where he served fifteen months until 1870, when he was removed by President Grant. His political appointments, and support for public education, including of Chinese immigrants, proved unpopular in the Democratic-leaning territory.

Railroad career
Ashley then returned to Toledo and became involved in the railroad business, linking that city with northern Michigan as well as the Ann Arbor/Detroit area. Ashley helped build the Ann Arbor Railroad and served as its president from 1877 (when he moved to Ann Arbor while two of his sons were enrolled at the University of Michigan Law School) until 1890, when his sons took over. The railroad went bankrupt in the financial crisis of 1893, but soldiered on and continues to operate today.

Later unsuccessful campaigns for Congress
He also ran unsuccessfully in Ohio for a seat in the U.S. House of Representatives in 1890 and 1892.

Death and legacy
Ashley suffered from diabetes since at least 1863. He died of heart failure after a fishing trip on September 16, 1896 in Alma, Michigan, and was interred in Woodlawn Cemetery (Toledo, Ohio). A eulogy at the Unitarian Church in Ann Arbor, Michigan, mentioned his large size, "intellectually, physically and morally. There was nothing petty, small or mean about him." Three years before his death, his efforts on behalf of racial equality were recognized by the Afro-American League of Tennessee, and he donated the proceeds of a book of his speeches to build schools. His great-great grandson Thomas William Ludlow Ashley, was later elected a U.S. Representative from Ohio.

Ann Arbor, Michigan named a downtown street leading to its railroad depot after Ashley. His descendant James Ashley IV recently completed a portrait of his great-grandfather, which is installed in the LaValley Law Library at the University of Toledo College of Law. In early 2010, the Ohio Historical Society proposed Ashley as a finalist in a statewide vote for inclusion in Statuary Hall at the United States Capitol.

Civil rights figure Frederick Douglass regarded Ashley as a white man who had a determination to secure equal justice for all, along with the likes of Benjamin Wade, Thaddeus Stevens, and Charles Sumner. Mary C. Ames described Ashley as the most genial and kind man in the Congress.

Some historians have been unkind in their views on Ashley. C. Vann Woodward called him, "a nut with an idée fixe" and Eric McKitrick described him as having, "an occult mixture of superstition and lunacy". A contemporary journalist, Benjamin Perley Poore, said Ashley was a "man of the lightest mental calibre and most insufficient capacity" who "passed much of his time in perambulating the aisles of the House, holding short conferences with leading Republicans, and casting frequent glances into the ladies' gallery."

Ashley is played by actor David Costabile in the 2012 Steven Spielberg movie Lincoln.

Footnotes

References

Further reading
  Pdf.
Zietlow, Rebecca E. The Forgotten Emancipator: James Mitchell Ashley and the Ideological Origins of Reconstruction (Cambridge University Press, 2018)

External links

 

1824 births
1896 deaths
People from Allegheny County, Pennsylvania
Republican Party members of the United States House of Representatives from Ohio
Montana Republicans
Governors of Montana Territory
Politicians from Toledo, Ohio
19th-century American railroad executives
People of Ohio in the American Civil War
Burials in Ohio
19th-century American politicians
American Freemasons